Shamsunnahar Jr. is a footballer of the Bangladesh women's national football team. Her teammate in the national team, Shamsunnahar Sr., is referred to as senior while she is junior. She was born on 30 March 2004. She was part of the squad that won the 2022 SAFF Women's Championship. She played for the Under-15 team in 2018. She also plays for Bashundhara Kings Women.

International goals

References 

Living people
Bangladeshi women's footballers
Bangladesh women's international footballers
Bashundhara Kings players
Bangladesh Women's Football League players
Women's association football midfielders
Bangladeshi women's futsal players
2004 births